Kallavesi (Ristiina) is a medium-sized lake in the Kymijoki main catchment area. It is located in the region of Southern Savonia in Finland. In Finland there are two lakes with this name, and the lake Kallavesi in Kuopio is much bigger.

See also
List of lakes in Finland

References

Lakes of Mikkeli
Lakes of Mäntyharju